The Encyclopedia of the Roman Empire, written by Matthew Bunson in 1994 and published by Facts on File, is a detailed depiction of the history of the Roman Empire. This work, of roughly 494 pages (a 2002 revised version contains 636 pages) stores more than 2,000 entries.

Versions
 US Hardcover revised edition (July 2002), published by Facts on File: 

The book gives the reader much information about the life and decay of Rome, bringing the reader through an interesting voyage in time.

References

 

1994 non-fiction books
Roman Empire
History books about ancient Rome